Bruce Woodcock (18 January 1920 – 21 December 1997) was an English light heavyweight and heavyweight boxer from Doncaster. He held the British and Empire heavyweight titles from 1945 to 1950, and was the European heavyweight champion 1946–1949. He fought unsuccessfully for a World title in 1950.

Biography

Early life and amateur career
Born in Doncaster, West Riding of Yorkshire in 1920 and brought up in Balby, Woodcock took up boxing at the age of 6, and was a schoolboy champion at the age of 12. He went on to work as a railway fitter in the L.N.E.R. loco sheds, joining the attached amateur boxing club. 

He was trained during his early years by his father, a former British Army lightweight champion. In 1938-39, he won the Northern Counties light heavyweight championship, qualifying for the ABA finals at the Royal Albert Hall in 1939, which he also won, beating A. Ford in the final. He represented England at the 1939 European Amateur Boxing Championships in Dublin, losing to Franciszek Szymura of Poland in the semi-final, and to Lajos Szigeti of Hungary in the third place bout.

Professional career
His railway job being deemed necessary war work, he was not called up during the Second World War, but in the early 1940s was redeployed to Manchester, where he worked as a maintenance engineer in a shell-making plant at Dukinfield. While in Manchester he met Tom Hurst, who became his manager, and he turned professional. He began his professional career in January 1942 with a third-round knockout of Fred Clarke, winning all of his first 20 bouts, 19 by stoppage, including a third-round knockout of Jack Robinson to take the BBBofC Northern Area cruiserweight title in September 1942 and a win over Canadian champion Al Delaney in October 1944. He held the Northern Area title until relinquishing in October 1944.

In July 1945, at White Hart Lane, Tottenham, Woodcock defeated the current champion Jack London to take the British and Empire heavyweight tiles. Woodcock won by a knockout in round six after having London down three times in that round. 

In September 1945, Woodcock was ranked third in the world by The Ring magazine, behind Tami Mauriello and Jimmy Bivins.

Woodcock won his next four bouts, including a win over Irish champion Martin Thornton, before suffering his first loss, by TKO at the hands of the vastly more experienced Mauriello at Madison Square Garden in May 1946. He bounced back from this by defeating Freddie Mills on points in June, before winning the European title by knocking out Paul Albert Renet in the sixth round in July. Woodcock went on to win his next three fights, stopping Gus Lesnevich in September, before rounding out the year by knocking out French champion Georges Martin in November and stopping Nils Andersson in December.

In March 1947, he successfully defended his European title against Stephane Olek, but a month later suffered his second loss, against Joe Baksi at the Harringay Arena in a fight billed as a final eliminator for the World title. He was floored three times in the first round and twice in the second and yet tried to come back before the referee stopped it in the seventh. He was later found to have suffered a broken jaw during the first round of the fight, requiring a stay of almost two weeks in hospital. Later in the year he spent several weeks in Leeds Infirmary being treated for an eye injury initially claimed to have been sustained while working in a quarry, although a hospital report later confirmed that the injury was a detached retina sustained in the Baksi fight, and he didn't return to the ring until September 1948.

Again, Woodcock bounced back in impressive fashion, scoring wins over Lee Oma and Lee Savold, followed by a third-round knockout of Johnny Ralph in March 1949 to win the British Empire Title (now known as Commonwealth Title) in South Africa.

On 2 June 1949, Woodcock again beat Freddie Mills, retaining the British, European and Empire heavyweight titles by a KO in round 14, in front of 50,000 people at the White City Stadium.

Woodcock was due to meet Lee Savold for the World heavyweight title (vacant due to the retirement of Joe Louis) in September 1949, but in August suffered head and shoulder injuries and concussion after crashing his lorry. The fight was initially rescheduled for May 1950, and as part of his training, Woodcock offered £100 to any sparring partner who could knock him down and £5 to anyone who could stay on their feet for a round in training. Woodcock and Savold eventually met on 6 June 1950 at White City before over 50,000 spectators. This was done under the auspices of the British Boxing Board of Control and recognised throughout Europe and the Commonwealth but not in the USA. In the event, a 15-round contest, Woodcock's left eye sustained a bad cut, and the fight was stopped in the fourth round.

On 14 November 1950, Woodcock lost his British and Empire Titles to Jack Gardner by an 11th-round TKO at Earl's Court. The following day he announced his retirement from boxing to avoid further damage to his eyes. In 1951, his autobiography, Two Fists and a Fortune, was published. Woodcock planned to return to boxing, but in March 1952 was refused a licence by the British Boxing Board of Control. Woodcock was known as a skilled and aggressive boxer with a good punch, however his face was vulnerable as the result of reopened cuts sustained through many bouts, and he was small for a heavyweight, putting him at a disadvantage on occasion. He finished with a record of 35 wins (31 knockouts) from 39 fights, with 4 losses.

Personal life and retirement
In December 1946, he married Nora Speight (born 14 July 1922, Doncaster - died 2 July 2008), with whom he had one son, Bruce, and one daughter, Janet. Bruce's brother, Billy, was also a boxer. Woodcock became the licensee of the Angel Hotel in Bolsover in May 1952. 

He went on to become a boxing manager, looking after local fighters such as Peter Aldridge and Peter Bates. He later ran the Tumbler Pub in Edlington. Woodcock died on 21 December 1997, aged 77. 

In 1971 actor Brian Blessed attempted to make a film about his hero Bruce Woodcock. He enlisted the help of fellow Z-Cars colleagues David Rose and Alan Plater but could not progress to production due to Woodcock's reluctance to be featured.

In 2013, a biography of Woodcock by Bryan Hughes, Battling Bruce: The Story of the Fighting Career and Rise to Fame of Bruce Woodcock, was published, with the author also starting a campaign for a statue of Woodcock to be erected.

Professional boxing record

See also
 List of British heavyweight boxing champions

References

Sources
  Wharton, Ronnie (2005), Fighting Men of the North, Tempus Publishing Limited,

Further reading
Woodcock, Bruce (1951) Two Fists and a Fortune, Hutchinson
Hughes, Bryan (2013) Battling Bruce: The Story of the Fighting Career and Rise to Fame of Bruce Woodcock

External links 
 
 Professional record at boxinghistory.org.uk
 

English male boxers
1920 births
1997 deaths
Sportspeople from Doncaster
Light-heavyweight boxers
Heavyweight boxers
European Boxing Union champions